Per Knudsen (2 June 1925 – 8 February 1999) was a Danish footballer, who played for AGF as a defender. He was also a member of the Danish team which competed at the 1948 and 1952 Summer Olympics, but he did not play in any matches.

Honours
Denmark
 Olympic Bronze Medal: 1948

References

1925 births
1999 deaths
Association football defenders
Danish men's footballers
Aarhus Gymnastikforening players
Footballers from Aarhus
Olympic bronze medalists for Denmark